The 1957–58 AHL season was the 22nd season of the American Hockey League. Six teams each played 70 games in their schedules. The Hershey Bears finished first overall in the regular season, and won their second Calder Cup championship.

Final standings
Note: GP = Games played; W = Wins; L = Losses; T = Ties; GF = Goals for; GA = Goals against; Pts = Points;

Scoring leaders

Note: GP = Games played; G = Goals; A = Assists; Pts = Points; PIM = Penalty Minutes

 complete list

Calder Cup playoffs
First round
Hershey Bears defeated Providence Reds 4 games to 1.
Springfield Indians defeated Cleveland Barons 4 games to 3.
Finals
Hershey Bears defeated Springfield Indians 4 games to 2, to win the Calder Cup. 
 list of scores

All Star Classic
The 5th AHL All-Star game was played on October 6, 1957, at the Rochester Community War Memorial in Rochester, New York. The defending Calder Cup champions Cleveland Barons lost 5-2 to the AHL All-Stars.

Trophy and Award winners
Team Awards

Individual Awards

See also
List of AHL seasons

References
AHL official site
AHL Hall of Fame
HockeyDB

American Hockey League seasons
2